The Skipper Cup (formerly the Sanyo Cup and The Digicel Cup) is the Fiji Rugby Union's national provincial Premier rugby union championship. The competition runs from May to September and is contested between the country's top 8 provincial sides. At the end of the competition the top 4 teams qualify for the semi-finals, with the winners moving on to the final. The competition has been sponsored by the phone company Digicel since 2008. Prior to that the trophy was called the Sanyo Cup.

Teams

See also

National Rugby Championship
Rugby union in Fiji
Fiji Warriors

References

External links

Rugby union competitions in Fiji
Rugby union competitions for provincial teams